Altenstadt may refer to:

Austria
Altenstadt (Feldkirch), a city district of Feldkirch, Vorarlberg

France
Altenstadt, part of Wissembourg, Alsace

Germany
Altenstadt, Hesse, in the Wetterau district 
Altenstadt, Swabia, in the district Neu-Ulm, Bavaria
Altenstadt, Upper Bavaria, in the district Weilheim-Schongau, Bavaria 
Altenstadt an der Waldnaab, in the district Neustadt (Waldnaab), Bavaria